Seo Wal-bo (1886-1926) was a Korean fighter pilot and independence activist who was considered as one of the first to be a pilot in his ethnicity.

Biography
Seo initially studied in the educational institution Daesung School, founded by Ahn Changho. He later moved to siberia and led the military training of independence activists. After training in a Chinese military school in 1909 and 1915,He became one of the chinese soldiers.After 1919, his main focus of his movement happened in Southern Manchuria.This is where he went to a Aviation school in Beijing, which led him to become a pilot.He also once led an air Brigade of chinese warlord Feng Yuxiang. Seo was part of the korean independence activist group Damuldan(多勿團), a group that was formed in Beijing in 1925.Seo died from a plane accident while going on a test flight with a plane made in Italy.

Award
Seo was posthumously awarded the National medal of the Order of Merit for National Foundation in 1990.

"First Pilot"
Seo used to be credited as the first Korean pilot ever to exist in history, however, an earlier example in 1918 exists, whose name was George Lee(Lee eungho), who made his first flight in 1918 as part of the American Air force.

See also
An Chang-nam

References

Further reading

1897 births
1926 deaths
Korean aviators